Laskier is a surname. Notable people with the surname include:

Rutka Laskier (1929–1943), Jewish teenager from Poland who wrote a Holocaust diary
Frank Laskier (1912–1948), British seaman famous during World War II

See also
Lasker (surname)